Fabian M. Dayrit is a professor of biology of the Department of Chemistry, School of Science and Engineering, Ateneo de Manila University. He served as professor of Ateneo de Manila's School of Chemistry and Engineering.

He graduated from Ateneo de Manila High School. He then pursued B.S. Chemistry at the Ateneo de Manila University (cum laude). Then he attended Princeton University at Princeton, New Jersey, U.S. He finished his M.A. and Ph.D. there.

He is also the current Director of the National. He is also the current President of the Integrated Chemists of the Philippines.

References

Living people
Year of birth missing (living people)
Place of birth missing (living people)
Filipino educators
Filipino chemists
Ateneo de Manila University alumni
Academic staff of Ateneo de Manila University
Princeton University alumni